This article is a list of statistics and records relating to the Chicago Blackhawks. The Chicago Blackhawks are a professional ice hockey team that joined the National Hockey League (NHL) in 1926 as one of the Original Six. The Blackhawks, who were known as the Black Hawks 1926 to 1986, has won the Stanley Cup six times in their 87-year history. This list encompasses the major honours won by the Blackhawks, records set by the team, their managers and their players, and details the team's NHL performances.

Team honors and achievements
The Chicago Blackhawks have won the Stanley Cup, the highest team honor in the National Hockey League, on six occasions. They also won the Clarence S. Campbell Bowl six times as the Western Conference champions, most recently in 2014-15. The Blackhawks won the Prince of Wales Trophy in 1966–67 as the regular season champions, then again in 1969–70 as the East Division champions. In 1990–91 and again in 2012-13 the team won the Presidents' Trophy for accumulating the most points in the regular season.

Stanley Cup
1933–34
1937–38
1960–61
2009–10
2012–13
2014–15

Prince of Wales Trophy
1966–67
1969–70

Clarence S. Campbell Bowl
1970–71
1971–72
1972–73
1991–92
2009–10
2012–13
2014–15

Presidents' Trophy
1990–91
2012–13

Player records

Appearances

Points
Most goals in a season: 58, by Bobby Hull in 1968–69.
Most assists in a season: 87, by Denis Savard in 1981–82 and 1987–88.
Most points in a season: 131, by Denis Savard in 1987–88.

Top goal scorers

Goalies

All Time
Wins     – Tony Esposito – 418
Losses   – Tony Esposito – 302
Shutouts – Tony Esposito – 74
Games    – Tony Esposito – 873
Minutes  – Tony Esposito – 51,839:00
GAA      – Charlie Gardiner – 2.02 (Min 100 games)
Save %   – Corey Crawford – .917 (Min 100 games)

Single season
Wins     – Ed Belfour – 43 (1990–1)
Losses   – Al Rollins – 47 (1953–4)
Shutouts – Tony Esposito – 15 (1969–70)
Games    – Ed Belfour – 74 (1990–1)
Minutes  – Tony Esposito – 4,219:00
GAA      – Charlie Gardiner – 1.64 (1933–4) min 20 games
Save %   – Jeff Hackett – .927 (1996–7) min 20 games

Penalty minutes
Most penalty minutes in a season: 408, by Mike Peluso in 1991–92.

Team records

Goals
Most goals scored in a season: 351 in 80 games, 1985–86.
Fewest goals scored in a season:
33 in 44 games, 1928–29.
133 in 70 games, 1953–54.
Most goals against in a season: 363 in 80 games, 1981–82.
Fewest goals against in a season:
77 in 44 games, 2012–13
78 in 48 games, 1930–31.
164 in 78 games, 1973–74.
189 in 82 games, 2014–15.

Points
Most points in a season:
107 in 78 games, 1970–71
107 in 78 games, 1971–72
112 in 82 games, 2009–10
Fewest points in a season:
17 in 44 games, 1927–28
31 in 70 games, 1953–54

Games

Record scores
Record win: 12–0 against the Philadelphia Flyers at The Spectrum on January 30, 1969.
Record defeat: 0–12 against the Detroit Red Wings at Joe Lewis Arena on December 4, 1987.

Consecutive results
Record consecutive wins: 12 (from December 29, 2015 to present).
Record consecutive defeats: 12 (from February 25, 1951 to March 25, 1951).
Record consecutive games without a defeat: 15 (from January 14, 1967 to February 16, 1967 and from November 29, 1975 to December 3, 1975).
Record consecutive games earning at least one point: 24 (from January 19, 2013 to March 9, 2013).
Record consecutive games without a win: 21 (from December 17, 1950 to January 28, 1951).

Longest Game
116 minutes and 12 seconds (On May 19, 2015)

References

Stats